The Main Street Pedestrian Mall in Riverside, California, stretching along Main Street from 5th to 10th street, was opened in 1966. The mall is flanked by the City Hall and convention center at either end. In 2008, the city carried out a $10 million renovation to the mall as part of the larger "Riverside Renaissance" project.

History

Before pedestrianization
Main Street was the main shopping street of Riverside for decades before it was pedestrianized in 1966. Major department stores included, at various times:
Sears, opened in February 1929 at 5th and Main, moved in June 1938 to a larger 38,000-foot store in a new art deco building (architect Henry L. A. Jekel) at the southeast corner of 7th (Mission Inn) and Main, on the site of the former Rubidoux Building. It would further expand in the 1950s.
Westbrook's (1935–1964)
Grout's
Montgomery Ward
J. C. Penney
Pic 'n Save (1930–1980)
S. H. Kress dime store, east side of Main between 8th and 9th streets
Reynold's, at 9th and Main
Woolworth's, southeast corner of 9th and Main (1940–1957)

References

External links
Photo Gallery
Pedestrian mall articles on "Raincross Square" blog

Pedestrian malls in the United States
Shopping malls in Riverside County, California
Shopping malls established in 1966
Buildings and structures in Riverside, California
Streets in Riverside County, California